Lonsdale Sports Arena was a  high-banked paved oval race track located  north of Pawtucket, Rhode Island, on Mendon Road (Rhode Island Route 122) in Cumberland, Rhode Island, on the banks of the Blackstone River.  Ironically, its location near the river would prove a key factor in its ultimate demise. The track operated from 1947 to 1956. Its name was a reference to the Lonsdale historic district in the towns of Cumberland and Lincoln. A Stop & Shop plaza now occupies where the arena was.

History

The site of Lonsdale Sports Arena was originally an earthen levee holding pond, used to retain water to power a local textile mill. The levee area was bought in 1934 by Edward A. McNulty, a local road builder, who first used it as a sand and gravel pit. McNulty later constructed a race track on the site.

Built for midget car racing, the asphalt race track hosted the quick open-wheeled machines during its inaugural season, 1947, as midget racing was king with Bill Schindler and his #2 car winning a season-high four features.  Other winners that year were Lloyd Christopher, Joe Sostillio and Ted Tappet.  Running mostly on Wednesday nights, the midgets also ran twice on Sundays and once on Friday in 1947.

The season finale for Lonsdale served as a bellwether for the future of motorsports in the next decade and through to the present day.  The MOA sanctioning body hosted the first-ever stock car race in the Northern United States on Sunday, October 26, 1947, with Fonty Flock capturing the 30-lap victory.  The MOA sanctioning body was the predecessor to a new and well-known brand of racing called NASCAR.  Bill France Sr. and other stock car entrepreneurs tested the waters at Lonsdale to see if stock car racing had longevity.  Decades later, these visionaries have proven their worth as NASCAR is the premier form of auto racing in the United States today.

A showcase for midget racing, Lonsdale's role in the post-war midget boom came to an end.  The debate over Offenhauser (Offy) and non-Offy powerplants was a part of the escalating costs of fielding a midget racer and contributed to a great divide within the ranks.  A cheaper form of racing was in the near future: the stock car experiment at Lonsdale proved to be it.  Stock cars soon replaced midgets at Lonsdale for good in the late 1940s or early 1950s.  The stock cars (also called Jalopies or Modifieds) were a godsend to the track operators.  The cars were cheap, provided many racing thrills and most importantly, the drivers and fans could not get enough of these stock cars.  It was truly great racing, watching the stock cars test the high banks drew massive crowds to a facility with grandstands that encircled the entire track.

Incidents
On October 12, 1949, a driver from Harris, Rhode Island, was killed in a rollover accident during a race at the track.

Closure
Lonsdale met its ultimate demise because of the Blackstone River.  Its location on the banks of the river proved problematic when the river crested, flooded the track and undermined the grandstands.  The subsequent dwindling crowds did not allow the owner to rebuild the grandstands.  The track's last race saw the same racing that started Lonsdale end its tenure on the racing circuit: an ARDC–USAC midget feature held on September 30, 1956. Cliff Riggot won the final race at Lonsdale in his Wozniak Offy.  The final season champion at Lonsdale was the venerable Fred Luchesi, who also won championships at Seekonk Speedway, Norwood Arena Speedway, Waterford Speedbowl and Westboro Speedway during this rough-and-tumble era.

New Jersey's Wall Township Speedway, which opened in 1950, was patterned after Lonsdale.

Sources
 Pronyne Motorsports Museum

References

External links
 Touring Series & Major Events at The Third Turn

Motorsport venues in Rhode Island
Defunct motorsport venues in the United States
Sports venues completed in 1947
1947 establishments in Rhode Island
1956 disestablishments in Rhode Island
Buildings and structures in Cumberland, Rhode Island
Sports venues in Providence County, Rhode Island
Defunct sports venues in Rhode Island